Daniel Brands was the defending champion but decided not to participate.
Lukáš Lacko defeated Jarkko Nieminen 6–3, 6–4 in the final to win the title.

Seeds

Draw

Finals

Top half

Bottom half

References
 Main Draw
 Qualifying Draw

IPP Open - Singles
2012 Singles